John Griffin (2 August 1859 – 13 July 1895) was an English doctor who became an international rugby union forward for Wales despite having no connections to the country.

Personal background
Griffin was born in Southampton in 1859, the eldest son of Dr. R. W. Waudby Griffin. He was partly educated at St Bartholomew's Hospital before gaining a place at Edinburgh University from which he qualified. During the late 1880s Griffin emigrated to South Africa in an attempt to improve his health, after suffering from hemoptysis. He first spent some time in Pretoria as a locum tenens before gaining a more permanent position in Port Elizabeth, where he set up a practice. After several years his health improved and in 1893 he travelled back to England in charge of small-pox patients on board a steamship. On his return to South Africa it was obvious he was suffering from tuberculosis and his condition worsened. In 1895 he returned to Southampton to spend his last days at his mother's home where he died on 13 July.

Rugby career 
Griffin was awarded his one and only international cap as part of the 1883 Home Nations Championship. Wales had only been playing rugby as an international country for two years when the team played in the 1883 Championship. This was the inaugural tournament and the fixture between Scotland and Wales was the first rugby encounter between the two countries. When Wales arrived in Edinburgh the party was a player short for the match, in similar circumstances to the 1882 clash with Ireland, and attempts were made to draft a player to fill the missing position. Griffin was at the time studying at Edinburgh University and had played rugby for the University team. Although not Welsh, the fact that he was English, made him the 'least Scottish' person to choose from and was brought into the Welsh squad. Griffin was one of three new caps in the Welsh squad, the others being Horace Lyne and John Arthur Jones, all three playing in the pack. Wales lost the game by three goals to one and Griffin returned to his studies and did not represent Wales again.

As part of the first British Isles tour to South Africa in 1889, the British side played three tests against the South African team. The first test was held in Port Elizabeth, and the game was refereed by Griffin.

International matches played
Wales
  1883

Bibliography

References 

1859 births
1895 deaths
English rugby union players
Wales international rugby union players
Rugby union forwards
Rugby union players from Southampton
People educated at Epsom College
Alumni of the University of Edinburgh
Alumni of the Medical College of St Bartholomew's Hospital
English rugby union referees
19th-century English medical doctors
19th-century deaths from tuberculosis
Tuberculosis deaths in England